Munkers Creek is a  long stream in Morris County, Kansas and Wabaunsee County, Kansas, in the United States. It ends at Council Grove Reservoir.

Munkers Creek was named for J. C. Munkers, a pioneer settler.

See also
List of rivers of Kansas

References

Rivers of Morris County, Kansas
Rivers of Wabaunsee County, Kansas
Rivers of Kansas